Rabbi Eliyahu Meir Bloch (October 23, 1894 – January 22, 1955), often referred to as Rav Elya Meir Bloch, was a leading Orthodox Jewish rabbi in the United States in the years after World War II. He founded the Telshe Yeshiva in Cleveland, Ohio together with Rabbi Chaim Mordechai Katz, and served as its first rosh yeshiva.

Early years 

Rabbi Bloch was born in 1894 on Simchas Torah in Telšiai (Telshe), Lithuania, then part of the Russian Empire, to Rabbi Yosef Leib and Chasya Bloch. His mother was the daughter of Rabbi Eliezer Gordon and his father therefore served as a maggid shiur in Rabbi Gordon's yeshiva, the Telshe Yeshiva in Telšiai. His father later took the positions of rabbi in Varniai and Shadova. He returned to Telšiai in 1910 when Rabbi Gordon passed away and succeeded him as the community's rabbi and rosh yeshiva.

Rabbinic career 

He married Rivka Kaplan, the daughter of the influential Klaipėda (Memel) merchant, Avraham Moshe Kaplan, and therefore moved to Klaipėda where he lived for eight years, studying Torah and delivering shiurim (Torah classes). In 1929, he returned to Telšiai and was appointed as one of the heads of the yeshiva. During this time, he was involvled in the World Agudath Israel.

The Holocaust 

In 1940, the Soviets occupied Lithuania and evicted the Telshe Yeshiva from their building, converting it into a military hospital. Combined with the fact that they were under Soviet rule and forbidden from teaching religion under the anti-religious Soviet laws, was the Nazi threat of overtaking Europe and exterminating its Jews. It was therefore decided that the yeshiva should move to the United States. Rabbi Bloch was sent to America together with Rabbi Chaim Mordechai Katz to arrange for the yeshiva's emigration. While they were in America, news reached them of the Nazi occupation of Lithuania, and out of touch with their families and yeshiva, they realized that their only option would be to reopen the yeshiva from scratch in the United States. They would later discover that their families and the whole yeshiva had been killed out by the Nazis.

Telshe Yeshiva in the United States 

Unlike most of the American yeshivas at the time which were established in New York, Rabbi Bloch opened the yeshiva in Cleveland, Ohio, to strengthen its Orthodox Jewish community. The primary Jewish influence in the city was that of the secular Jews, and the establishment of the yeshiva boosted the morale of the city's smaller Orthodox Jewish community.

A large part of the student body of the yeshiva was made of boys born and bred in the United States. Despite having lived their lives in Eastern Europe, both Rabbis Bloch and Katz were well attuned to the American way of thinking, and understood the students' feelings. However, the yeshiva was run like the Eastern European yeshivas from before the Holocaust, with strict discipline used in regards to its rigorous schedule. Rabbi Chaim Dov Keller, who studied in the yeshiva in its early years, recalled Rabbi Bloch's three-hour mussar shmuess (character-improvement talk) given when the students skipped a Saturday night learning session. In Rabbi Keller's words, "Rav Elya Meir gave the shmuess.... He told us that they had no intention of opening a yeshiva to cater to the whims of American society....He spoke of the Roshei Yeshiva they had left behind in Europe [who were murdered by the Nazis], whose emissaries they were. They would never agree to such a yeshiva." Rabbi Bloch then threatened to close the yeshiva if the students didn't cooperate.

Rabbi Bloch's influence on the Cleveland Jewish community was profound, as he pushed for the founding of Hebrew Academy of Cleveland, the Yavneh Seminary, and a kollel.

Death 

Rabbi Bloch died on January 22, 1955, and was buried at Mount Olive Cemetery in Solon, Ohio.

He was succeeded as rosh yeshiva by Rabbi Chaim Mordechai Katz.

References

1894 births
1955 deaths
Rosh yeshivas
American Haredi rabbis
Lithuanian emigrants to the United States
Lithuanian Haredi rabbis
Rabbis from Ohio
Rabbis from Telšiai
People from Telšiai
Religious leaders from Cleveland
Jews and Judaism in Cleveland